Walter James "Corky" Devlin (December 21, 1931 – April 28, 1995) was an American professional basketball player. He played three seasons in the National Basketball Association (NBA) with two different teams: two seasons with the Fort Wayne Pistons (1955–56 and 1956–57) and one with the Minneapolis Lakers (1957–58). He played in 210 games, averaging 7.1 points, 2.1 rebounds and 2.1 assists per game.

References

External links

1931 births
1995 deaths
American men's basketball players
Basketball players from Newark, New Jersey
Central High School (Newark, New Jersey) alumni
Fort Wayne Pistons players
George Washington Colonials men's basketball players
Minneapolis Lakers players
Philadelphia Warriors draft picks
Shooting guards